Kensei may refer to:

People with the given name
, Japanese actor 
, Japanese politician 
, Japanese actor
, Japanese politician
, Japanese football player 
, Japanese footballer

Other uses
 Kensei Hontō,a Japanese political party
 Kensei (horse), a racehorse
 Kensei (honorary title), an ancient Japanese honorary title given to extraordinary warriors
 Kensei: Sacred Fist, a video game

See also 
 

Japanese masculine given names